StegoShare is a steganography tool that allows embedding of large files into multiple images. It may be used for anonymous file sharing.

Features
 Supports various image formats (png, jpg, bmp, gif, tiff etc.)
 Maximal supported hidden file's size is 2Gb, number of cover images in the set up to 65536
 Average capacity is 40% (a 100 Mb file could be embedded into a 250Mb image)
 128-bit encryption
 Good output images quality (changes undetectable by human eye)

Use in the file sharing networks
This software can be easily used for anonymous file sharing. An uploader downloads legal images from a public photo hosting site, and embeds the censored file into those images. The uploader then uploads pictures to the public photo torrent tracker and puts the links referencing the stego pictures with censored file's description on a forum or blog. Downloaders, seeders, and public photo trackers, if caught distributing illegal files, are protected from legal prosecution, because they can always use plausible deniability, saying that they knew nothing about the illicit file in the images.  This is impossible to prove otherwise, as the human eye cannot differentiate between an ordinary image and a picture with hidden embedded file.

Vulnerabilities
The cover file manipulation algorithm used is based on fixed location LSB insertion, making its output images detectable to most steganalysis software by a simply Histogram Characteristic Function.

See also
 Steganography
 Anonymous p2p
 Plausible deniability

References

External links
 StegoShare Website with detailed technical and legal help

Steganography
Anonymity networks
Anonymous file sharing networks